Kennedy is a town in Lamar County, Alabama, United States. It was incorporated by an act of the legislature on February 18, 1895. At the 2010 census the population was 447, down from 541 in 2000.

Geography
Kennedy is located at  (33.580683, -87.983830).

Demographics
As of the census of 2000, there were 541 people, 226 households, and 169 families residing in the town. The racial makeup of the town was 85.40% White, 13.68% Black or African American, 0.55% Native American, and 0.37% from two or more races. 0.18% of the population were Hispanic or Latino of any race.

There were 226 households, out of which 33.6% had children under the age of 18 living with them, 58.8% were married couples living together, 13.7% had a female householder with no husband present, and 24.8% were non-families. 23.0% of all households were made up of individuals, and 11.1% had someone living alone who was 65 years of age or older. The average household size was 2.39 and the average family size was 2.82.

In the town, the age distribution of the population shows 23.7% under the age of 18, 8.5% from 18 to 24, 27.5% from 25 to 44, 24.2% from 45 to 64, and 16.1% who were 65 years of age or older. The median age was 39 years. For every 100 females, there were 82.8 males. For every 100 females age 18 and over, there were 78.0 males.

The median income for a household in the town was $24,750, and the median income for a family was $30,909. Males had a median income of $30,278 versus $19,250 for females. The per capita income for the town was $12,447. About 14.3% of families and 16.0% of the population were below the poverty line, including 23.3% of those under age 18 and 17.4% of those age 65 or over.

Government
Mayor: Jackie Mitchell
Chief of Police: Jake Fowler

Notable people
 William J. Hibbler, former United States federal judge
 John C. McAdams, associate professor of political science at Marquette University
 Jake Propst, Major League Baseball player for the Washington Senators
 Lee Stripling, singer and fiddler

See also
 List of cities and towns in Alabama

References

External links

Towns in Lamar County, Alabama
Towns in Alabama